USNS Maj. Stephen W. Pless (T-AK-3007), (former SS Maj. Stephen W. Pless (AK-3007)), is the third ship of the  built in 1983. The ship is named after Major Stephen W. Pless, an American Marine who was awarded the Medal of Honor during the Vietnam War.

Construction and commissioning 
The ship was built in 1983 at the Sun Shipbuilding, Chester, Pennsylvania. She was put into the service of Waterman Steamship Corp. as Charles Carroll.

In 1985, she was acquired and chartered by the Navy under a long-term contract as SS Maj. Stephen W. Pless (AK-3007). The ship underwent conversion at the National Steel and Shipbuilding, San Diego.

On 13 December 1990, she unloaded cargos during Operation Desert Shield.

Maj. Stephen W. Pless was put into the Maritime Prepositioning Ship Squadron 3, based in the Indian Ocean. She was later transferred to the Military Sealift Command Surge Sealift as USNS Maj. Stephen W. Pless (T-AK-3007). A mariner fell from the ship which caused a US Navy search party to be sent on 11 February 2014. On 20 February 2016, Maj. Stephen W. Pless anchored off the Gulf of Thailand during Exercise Cobra Gold 2016.

Crowley Government Services Inc. was awarded $14,513,105 to maintain USNS LCPL Roy M. Wheat (T-AK-3016), USNS Sgt. Matej Kocak (T-AK-3005), USNS PFC Eugene A. Obregon (T-AK-3006) and Maj. Stephen W. Pless on 29 September 2020.

References

Sgt. Matej Kocak-class cargo ship
1982 ships
Ships built in Chester, Pennsylvania
Merchant ships of the United States
Gulf War ships of the United States
Cargo ships of the United States Navy
Container ships of the United States Navy